Pravadoline (WIN 48,098) is an antinflammatory and analgesic drug with an IC50 of 4.9 μM and a Ki of 2511 nM at CB1, related in structure to nonsteroidal anti-inflammatory drugs (NSAIDs) such as indometacin. It was developed in the 1980s as a new antiinflammatory and prostaglandin synthesis inhibitor, acting through inhibition of the enzyme cyclooxygenase (COX).

However, pravadoline was found to exhibit unexpectedly strong analgesic effects, which appeared at doses ten times smaller than the effective anti-inflammatory dose and so could not be explained by its action as a COX inhibitor. These effects were not blocked by opioid antagonists such as naloxone, and it was eventually discovered that pravadoline represented the first compound from a novel class of cannabinoid agonists, the aminoalkylindoles.

Pravadoline was never developed for use as an analgesic, partly due to toxicity concerns (although these were later shown to be a result of the salt form that the drug had been prepared in rather than from the pravadoline itself), however the discovery of cannabinoid activity in this structurally novel family of drugs led to the discovery of several new cannabinoid agonists, including the drug WIN 55,212-2, which is now widely used in scientific research.

Animal studies

Administration of pravadoline on rats showed:
 Prolonged the response latency induced by tail immersion in hot water at a temperature of 55 °C (minimum effective dose 100 mg/kg s.c.)
 Prevented hyperalgesia in rats with brewer's yeast injections during (Randall-Selitto test) (minimum effective dose 1 mg/kg, p.o.)
 Prevented the nociceptive response induced by paw flexion in the adjuvant-arthritic rat (ED50 41 mg/kg, p.o.)
 Prevented the nociceptive response of bradykinin-induced head and forepaw flexion (ED50 78 mg/kg, p.o.)

The antinociceptive activity of pravadoline cannot be explained by an opioid mechanism, because pravadoline-induced antinociception was not antagonized by naloxone (1 mg/kg, s.c.) and pravadoline did not bind to the opioid receptors at concentrations up to 10 μM.

See also
 AM-630 (6-iodopravadoline)
 WIN 54,461 (6-bromopravadoline)
 WIN 55,212-2
 RCS-4 (1-pentyl-3-(4-methoxybenzoyl)indole)

References

Aminoalkylindoles
Benzoylindoles
4-Morpholinyl compunds
WIN compounds
Phenol ethers